The Fulton Ferry station was a station on the demolished BMT Fulton Street Line in Brooklyn, New York City. As the name implies, it was built to serve the Fulton Ferry between the two ferry slips in Brooklyn and Manhattan. The Fulton Street Elevated was built by the Kings County Elevated Railway Company and this station started service on April 24, 1888. The station had 2 tracks and 2 side platforms. It was served by trains of the BMT Fulton Street Line, and until 1920, trains of the BMT Brighton Line. This station was served by steam locomotives between 1888 and 1899. In 1898, the Brooklyn Rapid Transit Company (BRT) absorbed the Kings County Elevated Railway, and it took over the Fulton Street El, and it was electrified on July 3, 1899. It also had a connection to the Fulton Street trolley. Despite the fact that the ferry ceased operation on January 19, 1924, partially due to the increased use of the Brooklyn Bridge, it closed on June 1, 1940. On June 1 all service from Fulton Ferry and Park Row to Rockaway Avenue was abandoned, as it came under city ownership.

References

External links
BMT Fulton Ferry Station images (NYCSubway.org)

Defunct BMT Fulton Street Line stations
Railway stations in the United States opened in 1888
Railway stations closed in 1940
Former elevated and subway stations in Brooklyn